The Union for the Liberation of Ukraine (СВУ; Soyuz vyzvolennia Ukrayiny, SVU) was a political organization that was established on 4 August 1914 in Lemberg, Kingdom of Galicia and Lodomeria. The organization was established by Ukrainian emigrants from the Russia-held Dnieper Ukraine and who were socialist by their political views representing such political parties like Revolutionary Ukrainian Party (RUP), Ukrainian Social Democratic Workers Party (USDRP), "Spilka" Socialist-Democratic ("Fellowship"). The organization was headed by its presidium that consisted of Andriy Zhuk, Volodymyr Doroshenko, Oleksandr Skoropys-Yoltukhovskyi, and Markian Melenevskyi.

See also
 Persecuted bandurists
 Union for the Freedom of Ukraine trial

References

Sources
Roman Malko, "Music from the shadows", Zerkalo Nedeli, September 14–20, 2002. in Russian, in Ukrainian.
 , The Voices of the Dead - Stalin's Great Terror in the 1930s, Yale University Press, New Haven and London, 2007, .

Kobzarstvo
Ukrainian independence movement
1910s in Ukraine
History of Lviv
1914 establishments in Austria-Hungary
1918 disestablishments in Austria-Hungary
Ukrainian political parties in Austria-Hungary
Establishments in the Kingdom of Galicia and Lodomeria
Defunct secessionist organizations
Anti-Russian sentiment